The Green Mountain Film Festival is an annual film event and awards show in Vermont. The first festival took place in Montpelier, Vermont in 1997. In March 1999, a second festival was held and it has been an annual March event ever since. In 2010, the festival was extended to include a series of satellite screenings in St. Johnsbury, Vermont. In 2018, the festival also hosted screenings in Essex Junction at the Essex Cinema.

Background 
The program focuses on new work from around the world together with a few classic films. Around half the films shown are documentaries. There are also screenings of shorts and student films. Screenings are often followed by informal discussions often involving the filmmakers themselves. The festival also features special appearances by established film critics and filmmakers. Past guests have included critics Kenneth Turan, Molly Haskell, Phillip Lopate, David Thomson, Gerald Peary, and Matthew Hays. Filmmakers have included the screenwriter and director, Robin Swicord, actor/director Giancarlo Esposito, actor Michael Murphy, producer Christine Vachon, and documentary makers Albert Maysles, Les Blank and Ralph Arlyck.

The critic Stuart Klawans, writing in The Nation, described the 2003 Green Mountain Film Festival as "a cinephile's utopia: a festival organized and supported by an entire community of local moviegoers."

Matthew Hays, the Montreal-based film critic, called the 2006 festival "incredible ... a mind-bendingly fascinating diet of movies."

Every year hundreds of volunteers help run the festival and host special events at numerous venues across Montpelier, Vermont.

The 21st Green Mountain Film Festival was held between March 16 and March 25, 2018, and featured 82 feature films and 75 shorts, hand- on workshops, a “coming of age” film short course, and the first Vermont Filmmakers Summit. Then-current director Karen Dillon spoke about the 21st anniversary saying that she wanted the festival to “feel like a party for everyone”.

In 2021, during the COVID-19 pandemic, the festival was held virtually and returned to in-person for the 2022  event.

History

Films in earlier festivals (2006)

After Innocence
After the Fog
Ballets Russes
The Boys of Baraka
Campfire
Commune
Duma
The Education of Shelby Knox
Elevator to the Gallows
Le Grand Voyage
Hawaii, Oslo
Homeland
I Like Killing Flies
Intimate Stories
Isn't This a Time!
Live and Become
Living the Autism Maze
The Lizard, or Marmoulak
"Music and the Movies" with Lloyd Schwartz
Midnight Movies
Mind Games
Paradise Now
The Real Dirt on Farmer John
The Red Wagon
A Sidewalk Astronomer
The Singers
Sir! No Sir!
The Syrian Bride'Tony TakitaniTouch the SoundThe Warrior'Winterwalk
The World Outside

10th Festival 2007
The 10th Green Mountain Film Festival ran from 16 to 25 March 2007. Guests included Albert Maysles, Ralph Arlyck, Rob Mermin and Kenneth Turan. The films shown were:

Avenue Montaigne
Beauty in Trouble
Been Rich All My Life
Black Gold
El Carro
The Cave of the Yellow Dog
Climates
C.R.A.Z.Y.
Family Law
Flock of Dodos
Following Sean
Gimme Shelter
Gobi Women's Song
Grey Gardens
Gypsy Caravan
Holding Our Own
The Host
Into Great Silence
Jonestown: The Life and Death of Peoples Temple
Land Mines: A Love Story
The Light Ahead
Living on the Fault Line
Men at Work
Meredith Holch: Homegrown Animation
Molly's Way
Our Daily Bread
El Perro
The Refugee All-Stars
The Ritchie Boys
The Rules of the Game
Salesman
Shakespeare behind Bars
Sisters in Law
Suite Habana
Ten Canoes
Today's Man
Wondrous Oblivion

11th Festival 2008
The 11th Green Mountain Film Festival was held from 21 to 30 March 2008. Notable films shown were:

Blame it on Fidel
China Blue
Daratt
Day for Night
The Dhamma Brothers
The Edge of Heaven
Everything's Cool
For the Bible Tells Me So
Fraulein
Honeydripper
I'm Not There
It's a Free World...
Joe Strummer: The Future Is Unwritten
King Corn
Leonard Bernstein on Omnibus
Mother of Mine
Note by Note: The Making of Steinway L1037
OSS 117: Cairo, Nest of Spies
Protagonist
The Seventh Seal
The Visitor

12th Festival 2009
World Premiere - The Brother Who Sent His Sister to the Electric Chair (2009)
World Premiere - Numen: The Nature of Plants

13th Festival 2010
The festival added a new venue at the Pavilion Auditorium, and also a three-day series of satellite screenings in Vermont's North East Kingdom.

World Premiere - The Summer of Walter Hacks (2010)

14th Festival 2011
The festival inaugurated the Green Mountain 48-Hr Film Slam, a film-making competition, and announced the Margot George Short Film Competition, both initiatives aimed at fostering emerging film-making talent.

The 14th festival Guests included Phillip Lopate, David Amram, Roy Prendergast and Jonathan Katz.

References

External links
 
 A Conversation w/ Donald Rae nthWORD Magazine Shorts, July 2010
 Planning a trip to the Green Mountain Film Festival

Film festivals in the United States
Festivals in Vermont
Montpelier, Vermont
Tourist attractions in Washington County, Vermont